Kelly Jones (born 1974) is a Welsh singer and frontman of the Stereophonics.

Kell(e)y or Kellie Jones may also refer to:

Kelly Jones (Miss Alabama) (born 1976/1977), American beauty pageant titleholder
Kelley Jones (rower) (born 1965), American Olympic rower
Kelly Jones (tennis) (born 1964), American former tennis player
Kelly Jones (musician), American folk/alternative country artist who released the album Little Windows with Teddy Thompson
Kelly Jones, head girl in St Trinian's 
Kelley Jones (born 1962), comic book artist
Kellie Jones, see Harvest Rain Theatre Company
Kellie Jones (born 1959), American academic